Edward Knox may refer to:

Edward Knox (Australian politician) (1819–1901), Australian judge and politician
H. Edward Knox (born 1937), American politician
Edward M. Knox (1842–1916), Union Army soldier in the American Civil War and Medal of Honor recipient